Kanoli Dam is an earthfill dam on the Bori River near Dhule, in Nashik District in the Indian state of Maharashtra.

Specifications

Purpose
 Irrigation

See also
 Dams in Maharashtra
 List of reservoirs and dams in India

References

Dams in Nashik district
Dams completed in 1974
1974 establishments in Maharashtra